John Paul Giesy Jr.  (born 1948) is an American ecotoxicologist. He is a Full Professor and Canada Research Chair in Environmental Toxicology at the University of Saskatchewan. Giesy was credited with being the first scientist to discover toxic per- and poly-fluoroalkyl [PFAS] chemicals in the environment. His discoveries also include the photo-enhanced toxicity and the presence of perfluorinated chemicals in the environment.

Early life and education
Giesy was born in 1948 in Youngstown, Ohio, US. He graduated from Alma College in 1970 before enrolling at Michigan State University (MSU) for his master's degree and PhD. Giesy later received Alma College's Distinguished Alumni Award.

Career

MSU
Giesy started his career at the University of Georgia before returning to MSU. As a professor at MSU, Giesy became a member of their pesticide research center and served as president-elect of the Society of Environmental Toxicology and Chemistry. In 1987, Giesy was awarded a Fulbright Fellowship to lecture and conduct research at Bayreuth University in West Germany. Following this, he received the 1990 CIBA-GEIGY Agricultural Recognition Award for "lifelong contributions to the science of environmental toxicology and continuing excellence in research and teaching."

At the turn of the century, Giesy and Kurunthachalam Kannan were the first to report on "the global distribution of perfluorooctanesulfonate (PFOS), a fluorinated organic contaminant." Based on the findings of their 2000 study, Giesy and Kannan said that "PFOS were widely detected in wildlife throughout the world" and that "PFOS is widespread in the environment." They said that "PFOS can bioaccumulate to higher trophic levels of the food chain" and that the "concentrations of PFOS in wildlife are less than those required to cause adverse effects in laboratory animals." Giesy was also credited with being the first scientist to discover toxic per- and poly-fluoroalkyl [PFAS] chemicals in the environment.

As a result of his research, Giesy was named an Einstein Professor, the highest honor bestowed to non-Chinese by the Chinese Academy of Science, and was appointed the Distinguished Honorary Professor at King Saud University as the top environmental toxicologist in the world. During his tenure at MSU, his discoveries included the cause of deformities and lethality in birds of the Great Lakes, photo-enhanced toxicity, and the presence of perfluorinated chemicals in the environment, an important new class of contaminants widely used in common commercial products.

University of Saskatchewan
Giesy eventually left MSU to become a Canada Research Chair in Environmental Toxicology at the University of Saskatchewan (U of S) and professor in the Western College of Veterinary Medicine's Department of Veterinary Biomedical Sciences. In 2010, Giesy was elected to the Royal Society of Canada (RSC) for being "among the world’s most influential environmental toxicologists whose work in ecological risk assessment, including aquatic, wildlife and avian toxicology, has had global impact." He was also among the three nominees for the 2010 Innovation Place-Industry Liaison Office Award of Innovation for having co-developed an assay test that evaluates the effects of chemicals on hormones.

While at U of S, Giesy continued to conduct research on endocrine-disrupting chemicals and was sought by the U.S. Environmental Protection Agency to develop a way to test for these chemicals. As a result, his research team devised a test for use in worldwide screening programs. In 2012, Giesy was recognized with the Lifetime Achievement Award from the Paris-based Scientific Committee on Problems of the Environment and China’s Zhongyu Environmental Technologies Corporation. He was also awarded RSC's Miroslaw Romanowski Medal in recognition of his "critical work addressing environmental contamination."

As a result of the COVID-19 pandemic, and like many US municipalities, Giesy helped develop an early warning system for the coronavirus by sampling and testing the city’s wastewater. By 2021, his laboratory started picking up shedding of the SARS-CoV-2 Alpha variant two weeks prior to an Alberta outbreak by studying the sewage.

In 2019, Giesy was awarded an honorary doctorate from Masaryk University in the Czech Republic, in the field of environmental sciences.

Controversy
In 2018, Giesy was accused of covertly suppressing academic research on the dangers of PFAS for the benefit of 3M.  Attorneys representing the state of Minnesota claimed Giesy was part of 3M's alleged campaign to "distort" and "suppress" scientific research on the toxicity of per- and polyfluoroalkyl substances. Giesy subsequently denied all of the allegations and argued that they were "an attempt by the State of Minnesota and its Attorney General, Lori Swanson, to smear his reputation after he declined to serve as an expert for them in a lawsuit against 3M."  However, emails show that Giesy filtered studies, pushing those that he could to 3M in an effort to  delay or prevent publication, adding that he would bill differently to prevent a paper trail to 3M.

References

External links

Living people
1948 births
People from Youngstown, Ohio
American toxicologists
Academic staff of the University of Saskatchewan
Michigan State University faculty
Michigan State University alumni
Canada Research Chairs
Fellows of the Royal Society of Canada